The Polygonaceae are a family of flowering plants known informally as the knotweed family or smartweed—buckwheat family in the United States. The name is based on the genus Polygonum, and was first used by Antoine Laurent de Jussieu in 1789 in his book, Genera Plantarum. The name may refer to the many swollen nodes the stems of some species have, being derived from Greek, poly meaning 'many' and gony meaning 'knee' or 'joint'. Alternatively, it may have a different derivation, meaning 'many seeds'.

The Polygonaceae comprise about 1200 species distributed into about 48 genera. The largest genera are Eriogonum (240 species), Rumex (200 species), Coccoloba (120 species), Persicaria (100 species) and Calligonum (80 species). The family is present worldwide, but is most diverse in the North Temperate Zone.

Several species are cultivated as ornamentals. A few species of Triplaris provide lumber. The fruit of the sea grape (Coccoloba uvifera) is eaten, and in Florida, jelly is made from it and sold commercially. The seeds of two species of Fagopyrum, known as buckwheat, are eaten in the form of groats or used to make a flour. The petioles of rhubarb (Rheum rhabarbarum and hybrids) are a food item. The leaves of the common sorrel (Rumex acetosa) are eaten in salads or as a leaf vegetable.

Polygonaceae contain some of the most prolific weeds, including species of Persicaria, Rumex and Polygonum, such as Japanese knotweed.

Taxonomy
Polygonaceae are very well-defined and have long been universally recognized. In the APG III system, the family is placed in the order Caryophyllales. Within the order, it lies outside of the large clade known as the core Caryophyllales. It is sister to the family Plumbaginaceae, which it does not resemble morphologically.

The last comprehensive revision of the family was published in 1993 by John Brandbyge as part of The Families and Genera of Vascular Plants. Brandbyge followed earlier systems of plant classification in dividing Polygonaceae into two subfamilies, Eriogonoideae and Polygonoideae. Since 1993, the circumscriptions of these two subfamilies have been changed in light of phylogenetic studies of DNA sequences. Genera related to Coccoloba and Triplaris were moved from Polygonoideae to Eriogonoideae. The genus Symmeria does not belong to either of these subfamilies because it is sister to the rest of the family. Afrobrunnichia might constitute a new subfamily as well.

Brandbyge wrote descriptions for 43 genera of Polygonaceae in 1993. Since then, a few more genera have been erected, and some segregates of Brunnichia, Eriogonum, and Persicaria have been given generic status in major works. Some of the genera were found not to be monophyletic and their limits have been revised. These include Ruprechtia, Eriogonum, Chorizanthe, Persicaria, Aconogonon, Polygonum, Fallopia, and Muehlenbeckia.

Description

Most Polygonaceae are perennial herbaceous plants with swollen nodes, but trees, shrubs and vines are also present. The leaves of Polygonaceae are simple, and arranged alternately on the stems. Each leaf has a peculiar pair of fused, sheathing stipules known as an ochrea. Those species that do not have the nodal ochrea can be identified by their possession of involucrate flower heads. The flowers are normally bisexual, small, and actinomorphic, with a perianth of three to six sepals.  After flowering, the sepals often become thickened and enlarged around the developing fruit. Flowers lack a corolla and in some, the sepals are petal-like and colorful. The androecium is composed of three to eight stamens that are normally free or united at the base. The ovary consists of three united carpels that form a single locule, which produces only one ovule. The ovary is superior with basal or free-central placentation. The gynoecium terminates in 1 to 3 styles, each of which ends in a single stigma.

Genera
, Plants of the World Online accepted 56 genera:

Acanthoscyphus Small
Afrobrunnichia Hutch. & Dalziel
Antigonon Endl.
Aristocapsa Reveal & Hardham
Atraphaxis L.
Bactria Yurtseva & Mavrodiev
Bistorta (L.) Scop.
Brunnichia Banks ex Gaertn.
Calligonum L.
Centrostegia A.Gray
Chorizanthe R.Br. ex Benth.
Coccoloba P.Browne
Dedeckera Reveal & J.T.Howell
Dodecahema Reveal & C.B.Hardham
Duma T.M.Schust.
Enneatypus Herzog
Eriogonum Michx.
Eskemukerjea Malick & Sengupta
Fagopyrum Mill.
Fallopia Adans.
Gilmania Coville
Goodmania Reveal & Ertter
Gymnopodium Rolfe
Harfordia Greene & Parry
Harpagocarpus Hutch. & Dandy
Hollisteria S.Watson
Johanneshowellia Reveal
Knorringia (Czukav.) Tzvelev
Koenigia L.
Lastarriaea Remy
Leptogonum Benth.
Magoniella Adr.Sanchez
Mucronea Benth.
Muehlenbeckia Meisn.
Nemacaulis Nutt.
Neomillspaughia S.F.Blake
Oxygonum Burch.
Oxyria Hill
Oxytheca Nutt.
Persicaria Mill.
Peutalis Raf.
Podopterus Bonpl.
Polygonum L.
Pteropyrum Jaub. & Spach
Pterostegia Fisch. & C.A.Mey.
Pteroxygonum Dammer & Diels
Reynoutria Houtt.
Rheum L.
Rumex L.
Ruprechtia C.A.Mey.
Salta Adr.Sanchez
Sidotheca Reveal
Stenogonum Nutt.
Symmeria Benth.
Systenotheca Reveal & Hardham
Triplaris Loefl.

Former genera
Aconogonon (Meisn.) Rchb. – now included in Koenigia
Homalocladium (F.Muell.) L.H.Bailey – now included in Muehlenbeckia
Parapteropyrum A.J.Li – now included in Fagopyrum
Polygonella Michx. – now included in Polygonum
Rubrivena M.Král – now included in Koenigia

Phylogeny
The following phylogenetic tree is based on two papers on the molecular phylogenetics of Polygonaceae.

References

External links

Polygonaceae In: FNA volume 5 In: Family List In: Flora of North America At: eFloras
Polygonaceae In: Genera Plantarum (Jussieu) At: Genera Plantarum At: Search At: Botanicus.org
List of Genera in Polygonaceae At: Polygonaceae At: Caryophyllales At: Angiosperm Phylogeny Website At: Missoure Botanical Garden Website
List of genera in family Polygonaceae At: Dicotyledons At: List Genera within a Family At: Vascular Plant Families and Genera At: About the Checklist At: World Checklist of Selected Plant Families At: Data Sources  At: ePIC  At: Scientific Databases At: Kew Gardens
List of genera At: Polygonaceae At: List of families  At: Families and Genera in GRIN  At: Queries At: GRIN taxonomy for plants
non-core Caryophyllales At: Caryophyllales At: Root of the Tree (Life on Earth) At: Tree of Life web project
Polygonaceae In: Flowering Plants (Takhtajan)
Polygonaceae  in L. Watson and M.J. Dallwitz (1992 onwards). The families of flowering plants: descriptions, illustrations, identification, information retrieval.  http://delta-intkey.com 
Family Polygonaceae  Flowers in Israel
Polygonaceae of Mongolia in FloraGREIF

 
Caryophyllales families